The Women's Golf Coaches Association (WGCA), formerly known as the National Golf Coaches Association, is an organization formed in 1983 to promote women's intercollegiate golf. The vision of WGCA since its inception has been "to encourage the playing of intercollegiate golf for women in correlation with a general objective of education and in accordance with the highest tradition of intercollegiate competition".

Membership and governance
The WGCA has a membership of over 400 coaches of NCAA Division I, II, III, NAIA, and NJCAA collegiate programs.

WHCA is governed by a 13-member Board of Directors and the headquarters is located in Coral Springs, Florida.

Awards
The WGCA gives out many awards, including:
NGCA National Coach of the Year
NGCA Assistant Coach of the Year
Gladys Palmer Meritorious Service Award
NGCA Founders Award
PING Player of the Year
NGCA Freshman of the Year
Edith Cummings Munson Golf Award
Dinah Shore Trophy Award
Golfstat Cup Award
Kim Moore Spirit Award

In addition, they also recognize All-Americans as well as scholar-athlete All-Americans and a panel of 33 coaches in the country vote for the rankings for DI, II & III each week.

Hall of fame
Formed in 1986, the WGCA Hall of Fame consists of a Coaches Hall of Fame and a Players Hall of Fame.

See also
NCAA Division I Women's Golf Championship

References

External links
Women's Golf Coaches Association

Golf associations
Golf instruction
Women's golf in the United States
Women's sports organizations in the United States
Women's sports organizations
Golf
Sports organizations established in 1983
Non-profit organizations based in Florida
Coral Springs, Florida